Ballard Spur is a spur  north of Cape Wilson on the east side of the Nash Range. It was mapped by the United States Geological Survey from tellurometer surveys and from U.S. Navy air photos 1960–62, and named by the Advisory Committee on Antarctic Names for Thomas B. Ballard, a United States Antarctic Research Program aurora scientist at Hallett Station, 1961.

References 

Ridges of the Ross Dependency
Shackleton Coast